ISO 10962, generally known as CFI (Classification of Financial Instruments) is a six-letter-code used in the financial services industry to classify and describe the structure and function of a financial instrument (in the form of security or contract). It is an international standard approved by the International Organization for Standardization (ISO). Since 1 July 2017, each financial instrument should receive a CFI at the same time it is allocated an ISIN (International Security Identification Number) by the respective National Numbering Agency (NNA).

The CFI is attributed to a financial instrument at the time when the financial instrument is issued; it will normally not change during the life of that instrument.

Each of the six letters of the CFI represents a specific characteristic of the financial instrument (e.g. ESVUFB is used to describe a typical registered share). Those capital letters are drawn from the ISO basic Latin alphabet. 

The first letter of the code is the Category: E for Equity (shares and other instruments of that nature), D for Debt (particularly bonds), C for Collective Investment Vehicles, (i.e. investment funds), etc.

The purpose of the ISO 10962 standard is to provide a recognized standard for describing all financial instruments, which is recognized world-wide by all operators and computer systems in the financial and banking industries.  Classification of financial instrument (CFI) Code is used to define and describe financial instruments as a uniform set of codes for all market participants.
The code is issued by the members of ANNA, the Association of National Numbering Agencies.  The group is currently working to simplify the structure so that as to increase its use by non-governmental market participants.

History of ISO 10962 Modification
 Standard was first accepted and published in 1997 as ISO 10962:1997
 Its first revision, published in 2001, was ISO 10962:2001
 In 2006, FIX Protocol group published a proposal for changes of the standard for Consultation. 
 The last revised and accepted version of the standard is ISO 10962:2015 and was published by ISO in 2015. 
 In 2019 a revised version mainly related to OTC derivatives was published and the latest version externalizing the CFI codes was published in 2021.

Background and Goals of Introduction

Where distinct entities transact it is seen as helpful to establish a common transaction language. The CFI code is meant to provide the most comprehensive information possible, while at the same time maintaining the code manageability, provides a standard for identification of type of instrument and their main high level characteristics, determined by the intrinsic characteristics of the financial instrument, which would be independent of the individual names or conventions of a given country or financial institution. This principle avoids confusion arising from different linguistic usage as well as redundancy, while allowing an objective comparison of the instruments across markets.

CFI codes also aim to simplify electronic communication between participants, improve understanding of the characteristics of financial instruments for the investors, and allow securities grouping in a consistent manner for reporting and categorization purposes.

Structure of CFI Code
 The first character indicates the highest level of category of the Security. 
 The second character refers to the groups within each category. 
 The next four characters refer to four attributes, that varies between groups.
 The letter X always means Not Appl./Undefined.

Tabulated Structure of CFI Code

See also 
 Capital Market Taxonomy
 Central Index Key
 CUSIP
 ISO 6166
 ISO 10383
 ISO 20022
 International Securities Identifying Number
 NSIN
 FIX Protocol newsletter describing the options and futures CFI codes

References

External links 
 Classification of Financial Instruments codes (CFI, norm ISO 10962:2015)
 ISIN Assistance
 Detailed description of each CFI level by SIX Financial Information

Security identifier types
10962
Financial regulation
Financial metadata